The CM postcode area, also known as the Chelmsford postcode area, is a group of 25 postcode districts in England, within 16 post towns. These cover central Essex (including Chelmsford, Harlow, Brentwood, Billericay, Braintree, Burnham-on-Crouch, Dunmow, Epping, Ingatestone, Maldon, Ongar, Southminster, Stansted and Witham), plus a small part of east Hertfordshire (including Bishop's Stortford and Sawbridgeworth) and a very small part of the London Borough of Havering.

The southern part of the CM7 district for Braintree was recoded to CM77 in 2002.



Coverage
The Stansted post town (CM24) is entirely surrounded by the Bishop's Stortford post town (CM22 and CM23). The approximate coverage of the postcode districts:

|-
! rowspan="2"| CM0
| SOUTHMINSTER 
| Southminster, Bradwell, Tillingham, Asheldham, Dengie
| rowspan="2"|Maldon
|-
| BURNHAM-ON-CROUCH 
| Burnham-on-Crouch, Tillingham
|-
! CM1
| CHELMSFORD
| Chelmsford, Writtle
| Chelmsford, Uttlesford
|-
! CM2
| CHELMSFORD
| Chelmsford
| Chelmsford
|-
! CM3
| CHELMSFORD
| Hatfield Peverel, South Woodham Ferrers, North Fambridge, Cold Norton, Boreham, Maylandsea
| Chelmsford, Maldon, Braintree, Uttlesford
|-
! CM4
| INGATESTONE
| Blackmore, Fryerning, Ingatestone, Margaretting, Stock
| Brentwood, Chelmsford, Epping Forest
|-
! CM5
| ONGAR
| Chipping Ongar, High Ongar, Bobbingworth, Moreton, The Lavers, The Rodings
| Epping Forest, Chelmsford
|-
! CM6
| DUNMOW
| Great Dunmow, Felsted
| Uttlesford, Chelmsford
|-
! CM7
| BRAINTREE
| Braintree, Finchingfield, Great Bardfield
| Braintree, Uttlesford
|-
! CM8
| WITHAM
| Witham
| Braintree, Maldon
|-
! CM9
| MALDON
| Maldon, Tollesbury, Tolleshunt D'Arcy, Tolleshunt Knights
| Maldon, Colchester, Chelmsford
|-
! CM11
| BILLERICAY
| Billericay (East), Great Burstead
| Basildon, Chelmsford
|-
! CM12
| BILLERICAY
| Billericay (West), Little Burstead
| Basildon, Brentwood
|-
! CM13
| BRENTWOOD
| Brentwood, East Horndon, Great Warley, Herongate, Hutton, Ingrave, Little Warley, West Horndon
| Brentwood, Basildon, Havering
|-
! CM14
| BRENTWOOD
| Brentwood, Warley
| Brentwood, Havering
|-
! CM15
| BRENTWOOD
| Brentwood, Doddinghurst, Kelvedon Hatch, Mountnessing, Shenfield, Stondon Massey, Pilgrims Hatch
| Brentwood
|-
! CM16
| EPPING
| Epping, Theydon Bois, North Weald
| Epping Forest
|-
! CM17
| HARLOW
| Harlow, Old Harlow, Matching, Matching Tye, Matching Green, Church Langley
| Harlow, Epping Forest, Uttlesford
|-
! CM18
| HARLOW
| Harlow
| Harlow, Epping Forest
|-
! CM19
| HARLOW
| Harlow, Roydon
| Harlow, Epping Forest
|-
! CM20
| HARLOW
| Harlow, Gilston
| Harlow, East Hertfordshire
|-
! CM21
| SAWBRIDGEWORTH
| Sawbridgeworth
| East Hertfordshire, Epping Forest
|-
! CM22
| BISHOP'S STORTFORD
| Bishop's Stortford, Sheering
| Uttlesford, East Hertfordshire, Epping Forest
|-
! CM23
| BISHOP'S STORTFORD
| Bishop's Stortford, Thorley, Manuden
| East Hertfordshire, Uttlesford
|-
! CM24
| STANSTED
| Stansted Mountfitchet, Stansted Airport
| Uttlesford
|-
! CM77
| BRAINTREE
| Braintree, Great Notley, Rayne
| Braintree, Uttlesford, Chelmsford
|-
! CM92
| Harlow, Pinnacles
| 
| 
|-
! CM98
| Chelmsford
| 
| 
|-
! CM99
| Chelmsford
| 
| 
|}

Map

See also
 List of postcode areas in the United Kingdom
Postcode Address File

References

External links
Royal Mail's Postcode Address File
A quick introduction to Royal Mail's Postcode Address File (PAF)

Postcode areas covering the East of England
Borough of Basildon
Borough of Brentwood
Braintree District
City of Chelmsford
Epping Forest District
Harlow
Maldon District
Uttlesford